Nørre Nissum is a village situated in western Jutland, Denmark with a population of 981 (1 January 2022). Nearest larger town is Lemvig with a population of about 7000. This village has Denmark's smallest teachers training college: Nørre Nissum Seminarium and HF.

Notable people 
 Thorkild Fogde (born 18 July 1965) a Danish police officer and current Rigspolitichef
 Aage Kirkegaard (1914 in Nørre Nissum – 1992) a Danish field hockey player who competed in the 1936 Summer Olympics
 Marie Jepsen (1940–2018), member of European Parliament
 Ellen Trane Nørby (born 1980) a Danish politician, brought up in Nørre Nissum

References

External links
Nørre Nissum Seminarium
Map of Nørre Nissum

Villages in Denmark
Lemvig Municipality